The 1978 Australian Open was a tennis tournament played on outdoor grass courts at the Kooyong Lawn Tennis Club in Melbourne, Australia and was held from 25 December 1978 to 3 January 1979. It was the 67th edition of the Australian Open and the fourth Grand Slam tournament of the year. The singles titles were won by Argentinian Guillermo Vilas and Australian Chris O'Neil.

Seniors

Men's singles

 Guillermo Vilas defeated  John Marks, 6–4, 6–4, 3–6, 6–3  
• It was Vilas' 3rd career Grand Slam singles title and his 1st title at the Australian Open.

Women's singles

 Chris O'Neil defeated  Betsy Nagelsen, 6–3, 7–6(7–3)  
• It was O'Neil's 1st and only career Grand Slam singles title.

Men's doubles
 Wojciech Fibak /  Kim Warwick defeated  Paul Kronk /  Cliff Letcher, 7–6, 7–5  
• It was Fibak's only career Grand Slam doubles title.
• It was Warwick's 1st career Grand Slam doubles title.

Women's doubles
 Betsy Nagelsen /  Renáta Tomanová defeated  Naoko Sato /  Pam Whytcross, 7–5, 6–2  
• It was Nagelsen's 1st career Grand Slam doubles title.
• It was Tomanová's 1st and only career Grand Slam doubles title.

Mixed doubles
This event was not held from 1970 until 1985.

References

 
 

 
 

 
 
December 1978 sports events in Australia
January 1979 sports events in Australia
1978,Australian Open